Park Seung-wook (born 7 May 1997) is a South Korean footballer who plays as a defender for Pohang Steelers.

Career statistics

Club

Notes

References

1997 births
Living people
South Korean footballers
Association football defenders
Korea National League players
K3 League players
K League 1 players
Busan Transportation Corporation FC players
Pohang Steelers players
Dong-Eui University alumni